The 2017–18 Green Bay Phoenix women's basketball team represented the University of Wisconsin-Green Bay in the 2017–18 NCAA Division I women's basketball season. The Phoenix, led by head coach Kevin Borseth, in the sixth year of his current stint and 15th year overall at Green Bay, played their home games at the Kress Events Center and were members of the Horizon League. It was the 39th season of Green Bay women's basketball. They finished the season 29–4, 16–2 in Horizon play to win the Horizon League regular and tournament titles to earn an automatic to the NCAA women's tournament. They lost to Minnesota in the first round.

Roster

Schedule

|-
!colspan=9 style="background:#006633; color:#FFFFFF;"| Exhibition

|-
!colspan=9 style="background:#006633; color:#FFFFFF;"| Non-conference regular season

|-
!colspan=9 style="background:#006633; color:#FFFFFF;"| Horizon League regular season

|-
!colspan=9 style="background:#006633; color:#FFFFFF;"| Horizon League Women's Tournament

|-
!colspan=9 style="background:#006633; color:#FFFFFF;"| 2018 Women's NCAA Tournament

Rankings

References

Awards and honors

Horizon League Awards
Defensive Player of the year: Jen Wellnitz
All-League First Team: Jessica Lindstrom
All-League Second Team: Allie LeClaire
All-Freshman Team: Karly Murphy
All-Defensive Team: Jen Wellnitz, Jessica Lindstrom
All-Academic Team: Jessica Lindstrom

Green Bay Phoenix women's basketball seasons
2017–18 Horizon League women's basketball season
Green Bay